Cold November is a 2018 independent film written & directed by Karl Jacob. It premiered in competition at the 2017 Woodstock Film Festival and internationally at CPH:PIX.

A 12-year-old girl being raised within a matriarchal household is taken through the right of passage of killing a deer for the first time. Expectations dissolve into chaos, and Florence finds herself alone, relying on instinct and training to follow through with her decisions, pull herself together, and face becoming an adult in the North American wilderness.

Cast
 Bijou Abas as Florence
 Karl Jacob as Uncle Craig
 Heidi Fellner as Mia
 Anna Klemp as Amanda
 Mary Kay Fortier-Spaulding as Grandma Georgia

References

External links
 
 

2018 films
American independent films
2010s English-language films
2010s American films